Kassandra is a Venezuelan telenovela written by Delia Fiallo and produced by RCTV.  The story revolves around a young woman, Kassandra who grows up in a traveling circus among many Romani people. She thinks she is connected to the ethic subgroup not knowing that she is in fact the granddaughter of a rich landowner whose stepson she falls desperately in love with. This love culminates in everyone around Kassandra discovering hidden secrets and her greatly suffering because of it.

Kassandra lasted 150 episodes between October 1992 and May 1993, and it achieved a worldwide amount of success outside Venezuela. It was extremely successful in its later airings, especially in United States, Romania, Greece, Italy, Russia, former Eastern Bloc nations, former Yugoslavia and Bulgaria, as well as the Middle East, South Asia and East Asia. In 2008, the show was also remade in Russia as Принцесса цирка (Princess of the Circus).

Coraima Torres, Osvaldo Ríos & Henry Soto starred as protagonists  with Nury Flores, Alexander Milic, Loly Sánchez, Erika Madina and also Osvaldo Ríos as the antagonists.

Synopsis
The action begins 20 years prior to the actual plot, when a travelling circus sets up on the outskirts of Caracas. Andreina Arocha, the daughter of a wealthy landowner, is awestruck by the clowns, the wild animals, and a Gypsy fortuneteller who relates wonderful things the future has in store. Unbeknownst to Andreina, the fortuneteller actually sees a tragic destiny for her and something mysterious forewarns that their paths will meet again. One year later when the circus returns, Andreina has died of a terminal illness after giving birth to a baby girl. At the same time, Andreina's stepmother, Herminia, an unscrupulous and overly-ambitious woman, discovers that a Gypsy from the circus and her newborn have died during childbirth. Herminia, who has twin sons from a previous marriage and wants them to be sole heirs to the Arocha fortune, plots a devious plan and carries it out with the help of a hired hand. One dark night, he follows Herminia's orders to exchange the infants. In the crib, the lifeless body of the infant Gypsy replaces Andreina's healthy child who in turn is given to the Gypsies. The next day, the circus packs up and leaves town.

Years go by. Finally, one day the circus returns and so does Kassandra, who has grown to be a beautiful young woman. According to Gypsy tradition, the woman who raised Kassandra, her supposed grandmother, promised her hand in matrimony when she was an infant to Randu, a rough young man who is now the leader of the tribe.

During the first night of the Gypsies' arrival to town, while Randu dances with his future wife, Kassandra's eyes wander to another man. Their eyes meet and become locked in a strong mutual attraction. The man who stares is Luis David, one of Herminia's twin sons. Later the two talk below the starry sky, in the loneliness of the mountainside where they share a magical moment. The following day however, Luis David leaves town without a word.

Not long after, his twin brother Ignacio discovers that Kassandra is the true heir to the Arocha fortune and he tricks her into marrying him. The first night of their fateful honeymoon, Ignacio is mysteriously killed by his ex-wife and maid Rosaura, but Kassandra thinks that he has left her. In an effort to discover his brother's assassin, Luis David returns and assumes Ignacio's identity. His suspicions fall on Kassandra, the beautiful young gypsy who knew her husband so briefly and who now believes that Luis David is her husband.

Cast

 Coraima Torres as Andreina Arocha de Rangel/Kassandra la gitana/Kassandra Rangel Arocha/Kassandra Rangel de Contreras
 Osvaldo Ríos as Ignacio Contreras/Luis David Contreras
 Henry Soto as Randu
 Raul Xiques as Alfonso Arocha
 Carmencita Padron as Ofelia Alonso
 Nury Flores as Herminia Arocha
 Esperanza Magaz as Dorinda
 Carlos Arreaza as Tomas
 Alexander Milic as Matias Osorio
 Hylene Rodriguez as Lilia Rosa Alonso
 André Filipe as Transformista Barato
 Ivan Tamayo as Hector Quintero
 Loly Sanchez as Rosaura Osorio
 Fernando Flores as Simon
 Veronica Cortez as Yaritza
 Juan Frankis as Marcelino
 Erika Medina as Isabel
 Rafael Romero as Glinka
 Cecilia Villarreal as Gema Salazar
 Roberto Moll as Manrique Alonso
 Mimi Sills as Elvira Alonso
 Manuel Escolano as Roberto Alonso
 Miguel de León as Ernesto Rangel
 Saul Martinez as Doctor
 Nelly Prigoryan as Verushka
 Lupe Barrado	
 Ron Duarte
 Pedro Duran as Calunga
 Eduardo Gadea Perez as Judge
 Margarita Hernandez as Norma De Castro
 Maria Hinojosa
 Felix Landaeta as Lic. Carrion
 Frank Moreno
 Julio Mujica
 Jose Oliva as Lic. Olivera
 Carlos Omana

References

External links

Opening Credits

1992 telenovelas
RCTV telenovelas
Venezuelan telenovelas
1992 Venezuelan television series debuts
1993 Venezuelan television series endings
Spanish-language telenovelas
Television shows set in Venezuela